Yuppie, short for "young urban professional" or "young upwardly-mobile professional", is a term coined in the early 1980s for a young professional person working in a city. The term is first attested in 1980, when it was used as a fairly neutral demographic label, but by the mid-to-late 1980s, when a "yuppie backlash" developed due to concerns over issues such as gentrification, some writers began using the term pejoratively.

History

The first printed appearance of the word was in a May 1980 Chicago magazine article by Dan Rottenberg.  Rottenberg reported in 2015 that he did not invent the term, he had heard other people using it, and at the time he understood it as a rather neutral demographic term.  Nonetheless, his article did note the issues of socioeconomic displacement which might occur as a result of the rise of this inner-city population cohort.  Joseph Epstein was credited for coining the term in 1982, although this is contested.

The term gained currency in the United States in 1983 when syndicated newspaper columnist Bob Greene published a story about a business networking group founded in 1982 by the former radical leader Jerry Rubin, formerly of the Youth International Party (whose members were called "yippies"); Greene said he had heard people at the networking group (which met at Studio 54 to soft classical music) joke that Rubin had "gone from being a yippie to being a yuppie". The headline of Greene's story was "From Yippie to Yuppie". East Bay Express humorist Alice Kahn elaborated on the concept in a satirical piece published in June 1983, further popularizing the term.

The proliferation of the word was affected by the publication of The Yuppie Handbook in January 1983 (a tongue-in-cheek take on The Official Preppy Handbook), followed by Senator Gary Hart's 1984 candidacy as a "yuppie candidate" for President of the United States. The term was then used to describe a political demographic group of socially liberal but fiscally conservative voters favoring his candidacy. Newsweek magazine declared 1984 "The Year of the Yuppie", characterizing the salary range, occupations, and politics of "yuppies" as "demographically hazy". The alternative acronym yumpie, for young upwardly mobile professional, was also current in the 1980s but failed to catch on.

In a 1985 issue of The Wall Street Journal, Theressa Kersten at SRI International described a "yuppie backlash" by people who fit the demographic profile yet express resentment of the label: "You're talking about a class of people who put off having families so they can make payments on the SAABs ... To be a Yuppie is to be a loathsome undesirable creature". Leo Shapiro, a market researcher in Chicago, responded, "Stereotyping always winds up being derogatory. It doesn't matter whether you are trying to advertise to farmers, Hispanics or Yuppies, no one likes to be neatly lumped into some group."

In 1989, rock artist Tom Petty used the term in the song Yer So Bad, in the line "My sister got lucky, married a yuppie".

The word lost most of its political connotations and, particularly after the 1987 stock market crash, gained the negative socio-economic connotations that it sports today. On April 8, 1991, Time magazine proclaimed the death of the "yuppie" in a mock obituary.

The term experienced a resurgence in usage during the 2000s and 2010s. In October 2000, David Brooks remarked in a Weekly Standard article that Benjamin Franklin – due to his extreme wealth, cosmopolitanism, and adventurous social life – is "Our Founding Yuppie". A recent article in Details proclaimed "The Return of the Yuppie", stating that "the yuppie of 1986 and the yuppie of 2006 are so similar as to be indistinguishable" and that "the yup" is "a shape-shifter... he finds ways to reenter the American psyche." In 2010, right-wing political commentator Victor Davis Hanson wrote in National Review very critically of "yuppies".

In the British TV series Only Fools and Horses one of the lead characters Delboy calls himself a Yuppie in Series 6 Episode 1 "Yuppy Love".

Usage outside the United States
"Yuppie" was in common use in Britain from the early 1980s onward (the premiership of Margaret Thatcher) and by 1987 had spawned subsidiary terms used in newspapers such as "yuppiedom", "yuppification", "yuppify" and "yuppie-bashing".

A September 2010 article in The Standard described the items on a typical Hong Kong resident's "yuppie wish list" based on a survey of 28- to 35-year-olds. About 58% wanted to own their own home, 40% wanted to professionally invest, and 28% wanted to become a boss. A September 2010 article in The New York Times defined as a hallmark of Russian "yuppie life" the adoption of yoga and other elements of Indian culture such as their clothes, food, and furniture.

See also
 Baby boomers
 Dink (Dual Income No Kids)
 Hipster
 International Debutante Ball
 Opportunities (Let's Make Lots of Money)
 Patrick Bateman, a murderous yuppie from the novel American Psycho
 Social climber

References

Further reading

External links

1980s slang
Age-related stereotypes
Class-related slurs
Lifestyles
Stereotypes of the upper class
Stereotypes of urban people
Upper class culture in the United States
Upper middle class
1980 neologisms
Socioeconomic stereotypes